Lamont Barnes (born September 4, 1978) is an American professional basketball player who last played for Carramimbre CBC Valladolid of the Spanish LEB Oro league.

References
ACB profile

Living people
African-American basketball players
American expatriate basketball people in Bulgaria
American expatriate basketball people in France
American expatriate basketball people in Italy
American expatriate basketball people in Poland
American expatriate basketball people in Spain
Baloncesto Fuenlabrada players
Baloncesto León players
Basketball players from Lexington, Kentucky
CB Estudiantes players
CB Lucentum Alicante players
CB Murcia players
CB Valladolid players
Centers (basketball)
JDA Dijon Basket players
Liga ACB players
Scafati Basket players
Temple Owls men's basketball players
Yakima Sun Kings players
Palencia Baloncesto players
American men's basketball players
21st-century African-American sportspeople
20th-century African-American sportspeople
Criollos de Caguas basketball players
1978 births